Boo & Gotti were an American hip-hop duo composed of Sabrian "Boo" Sledge and Mwata "Gotti" Mitchell. They are perhaps best known for appearing on the 2001 hit "Fiesta (Remix)" with R. Kelly and Jay-Z. The single peaked at number 6 on the Billboard Hot 100 and spent five consecutive weeks at No. 1 on the Billboard Hot R&B/Hip-Hop Singles & Tracks. Other notable appearances include R Kelly's "I Wish (Remix)", Big Tymers's 2002 single "Oh Yeah", and The Fast and the Furious soundtrack.

Following the success of "Fiesta", the duo signed a record deal with Cash Money Records and recorded their debut album Perfect Timing, which was released during the summer of 2003. The album, however, was a commercial flop, only reaching number 195 on the Billboard 200. Following the album's failure, the duo was released from Cash Money.

In 2005, Boo signed with Lil Wayne's Young Money Entertainment as a solo artist, but shortly parted ways with the label.

Discography

Studio albums

Singles

As lead artist

As featured artist

Guest appearances

References 

American hip hop groups
African-American musical groups
Cash Money Records artists
American musical duos
Musical groups from Chicago
Rappers from Chicago
Musical groups established in 2001
Hip hop duos